Michael Chow Man-Kin (周文健) is a Beijing-born Hong Kong-based actor.

Filmography

 Inspector Chocolate (1986) - Inspector Leung
 Goodbye Darling (1987) - Party Member with gun
 City War (1988) - Bobby
 The Big Heat (1988) - Assassin
 The Inspector Wears Skirts (1988) - Peter
 Heart to Hearts (1988)
 Police Story 2 (1988) - CID Cop
 Keep on Dancing (1988) - Mental patient
 Blood Call (1988) - Michael
 The Eighth Happiness (1988) - Ying-Ying's boyfriend
 Raid on Royal Casino Marine aka. The Inspector Wears Skirts III (1990) - Captain
 God of Gamblers (1989) - Casino manager
 Miracles (1989) - Dai Jek Dung
 I Am Sorry (1989)
 Hearts No Flowers (1989)
 Nobles (1989) - Blind Date
 Her Fatal Ways 2 (1991) - Ah Fu
 Fallen Angel (1991) (TV) - Angel
 Alien Wife (1991)
 Her Fatal Ways (1991) - Niu
 Cash on Delivery (1992) - Rookie gigolo
 Fight Back to School II (1992) - Undercover student
 Talk to Me Dicky (1992)
 Sister in Law (1992)
 Forced Nightmare (1992) - Vampire
 Changing Partner (1992) - Mr. Cheung
 Even Mountains Meet (1993) - Mambo
 Tom, Dick and Hairy (1993) - Michelle
 Thou Shalt Not Swear (1993) - Inspector Chow
 Vampire Family (1993) - Werewolf Butler
 He Ain't Heavy... He's My Father (1993) - The Professor
 Kung Fu Scholar (1993) - Ah Mou
 Crazy Hong Kong (1993) - Truck driver
 Beginner's Luck (1994) - Hark
 The Third Full Moon (1994) - Inspector Chow
 Modern Romance (1994) - Mr. Five Elements
 Doug's Choice (1994) - Douglas Ng
 The Crucifixion (1994) - Ah Yung
 Asian Connection (1995) - Ah Mike
 The Case of the Cold Fish (1995) - Jau Zai / Dick Chow Long-Dong
 Twist (1995) - Dr. Lam
 City Cop (1995) - Chow Sir
 Mr. Mumble (1996) - Ryô Saeba / Mr. Mumble
 Bodyguards of the Last Governor (1996) - Bodyguard, Dai Kin
 Banana Club (1996) - Michael
 02:00 A.M. (1996) - Ghost-obsessed dancer
 Web of Deception (1997) - Donson Woo
 Enjoy Yourself Tonight (1997) - Sau Sou Lo
 Top Borrower (1997) - Dai B
 Killing Me Hardly (1997) - Bob
 All's Well, Ends Well 1997 (1997) - Himself
 24 Hours Ghost Story (1997) - Himself
 The Spirit of the Dragon (1998)
 Love in Shanghai (1998) (TV) - Lao Da
 Ninth Happiness (1998) - Ma Lun Dai
 14 Days Before Suicide (1999)
 Golden Nightmare (1999) - Joe
 Temptation of an Angel (1999) - Fei
 Sworn Revenge (2000) - Michael Wong Si
 9 September (2000) - Michael
 Snakeheads (2001) - Chung
 The Era of Vampires (2002) - Fat
 Twilight Zone Cops: My Spirited Wife (2002) (V) - Officer Ben Li
 Fate Fighter (2003)
 Kung Phooey! (2003) - Art Chew
 Forever Yours (2004) - Lou Jao
 Love Trilogy (2004) - Li Caishun
 Son of the Dragon (2008) - Bo
 The Sparring Partner (2022)
 Where the Wind Blows (2023) - Fat-Bee

External links
 
 HK Cinemagic entry
 lovehkfilm entry

1960 births
20th-century Chinese male actors
20th-century Hong Kong male actors
21st-century Chinese male actors
21st-century Hong Kong male actors
Chinese emigrants to Hong Kong
Chinese expatriates in Hong Kong
Chinese male film actors
Chinese male television actors
Hong Kong male film actors
Hong Kong male television actors
Living people
Male actors from Beijing
York University alumni